The Mamilian commission (also called the rogatio Mamilia) was established by Gaius Mamilius in 109 BC for the investigation of corruption and treason. One of its other purposes was to hold Roman commanders responsible for their defeats. Its jurors were pulled from the equestrian class, rather than the Senatorial class, launching an assault against corruption in the ruling Senatorial oligarchy. This broad assault against corruption across the state, in the opinion of Sallust, led to the commission conducting "[its] investigation[s] with harshness and violence, on hearsay evidence and at the caprice of the commons".

In its first year, it convicted four men of consular rank for alleged crimes against the state. In 106 the Commission would have its independence significantly eroded in a bill introduced by Quintus Servilius Caepio to the Plebeian Council, which changed the jury pool from solely the equestrians to a mix of equestrians and Senators.

One of the long-term consequences of the commission – trending into the repeated consulships of Gaius Marius – was to inculcate a general feeling that the existing senatorial leadership (the nobiles) were failing in their responsibility to look after the state and defeat Rome's enemies.

References

Sources 
 
 

Government of the Roman Republic
Roman Republic